Remond Kaj Larsen (30 March 1914 – 18 June 2007) was a Danish rower. He competed at the 1936 Summer Olympics in Berlin with the men's coxed pair where they came fourth.

References

1914 births
2007 deaths
Danish male rowers
Olympic rowers of Denmark
Rowers at the 1936 Summer Olympics
Rowers from Copenhagen
European Rowing Championships medalists